Rujeib is a Palestinian town in the Nablus Governorate of the State of Palestine, in the northern West Bank, located 3 kilometers southeast of Nablus. According to the Palestinian Central Bureau of Statistics (PCBS), the town had a population of 3,915 inhabitants in mid-year 2006.

Location
Rujeib is located 4.3 km south east of Nablus. It is bordered by Beit Furik to the east, ‘Awarta to the south, and Nablus to the north and west.

History
There was a human habitation here during the Chalcolithic era.

Sherds from the Late Bronze Age/Iron Age I, Hellenistic, Roman and Byzantine eras have been found here.

It has been suggested that Rujeib was the Crusader village Ragabam, which was one of the villages exchanged with Bethany by King Baldwin I and given as a fief to the Church of the Holy Sepulchre. Pottery from the Crusader era have also been found here.

Ottoman era
In 1517, the village was included in the Ottoman empire with the rest of Palestine, and in the 1596 tax-records it appeared as Rujib, located in the Nahiya of Jabal Qubal in the Nablus Sanjak. The population was 16 households and 1 bachelors, all Muslim. They paid a fixed tax rate of 33.3% on agricultural products, such as wheat, barley, summer crops, olive trees, goats and beehives, a press for olive oil or grape syrup, in addition to occasional revenues and a fixed tax for people of Nablus area; a total of 3,600 Akçe.

In 1838, Raujib was noted in the El-Beitawy district, east of Nablus, together with Beita, Haudela and Awarta. In 1850/51 de Saulcy noted Roujib on a lower hill than Beit Dejan.

In 1870, Victor Guérin noted that Rujeib was a "village of three hundred inhabitants more, on a hill whose flanks were formerly, in several places, exploited as a quarry. Cactus hedges serve as enclosures for some gardens."

In 1882, the Palestine Exploration Fund's Survey of Western Palestinedescribed Rujib as "A village of moderate size to the east of the plain so named, with a few olives round it."

British Mandate era
In the 1922 census of Palestine conducted by the British Mandate authorities, Rujib had a population of 250 Muslims, increasing in the 1931 census to  277 Muslims, in 58 houses.

In the 1945 statistics, Rujeib had a population of 390 Muslims while the total land area was 7,038 dunams, according to an official land and population survey. Of this, 235 dunams were used for plantations and irrigable land, 3,410 for cereals, while 30 dunams were classified as built-up (urban) areas.

Jordanian era
In the wake of the 1948 Arab–Israeli War, and after the 1949 Armistice Agreements, Rujeib came under Jordanian rule.

In 1961, the population of Rujeib was 628 persons.

Post 1967
Since the Six-Day War in 1967, Rujeib has been under Israeli occupation. The population in the 1967 census conducted by Israel was 831, of whom 30 originated from the Israeli territory.

After the 1995 accord 28% of Rujeib’s lands were classified as Area B, the remaining 72% as Area C. Israel has confiscated 169 dunams of land from Rujeib for construction of the Israeli settlement of Itamar.

References

Bibliography

External links
Welcome to Rujeib
Rujeib Welcome to Palestine
Survey of Western Palestine, Map 11:     IAA, Wikimedia commons 
 Rujeib village profile,  Applied Research Institute–Jerusalem (ARIJ)
Rujeib (aerial photo),  ARIJ
Development Priorities and Needs in Rujeib,  ARIJ 

Nablus Governorate
Villages in the West Bank
Municipalities of the State of Palestine